is a former Japanese football player. He played for Japan national team.

Club career
Suzuki was born in Yaizu on August 3, 1970. After graduating from Shizuoka Gakuen High School, he joined Japan Soccer League club Nissan Motors (later Yokohama Marinos) in 1989. In 1989-90, the club won all three major title in Japan; Japan Soccer League, JSL Cup and Emperor's Cup. The club also won 1990 JSL Cup and 1991 Emperor's Cup. In Asia, the club won 1991–92 Asian Cup Winners' Cup. In 1992, Japan Soccer League was folded and founded new league J1 League. The club won 1992 Emperor's Cup. In Asia, the club won 1992–93 Asian Cup Winners' Cup for 2 years in a row. In 1995, the club won J1 League and he was selected Best Eleven. He moved to Nagoya Grampus Eight in 1997. He retired end of 1998 season.

National team career
On October 24, 1995, Suzuki debuted for Japan national team against Saudi Arabia. He also played in 1996. He played 2 games for Japan until 1996.

Club statistics

National team statistics

Awards
J.League Best XI – 1995

References

External links

Japan National Football Team Database

1970 births
Living people
Association football people from Shizuoka Prefecture
Japanese footballers
Japan international footballers
Japan Soccer League players
J1 League players
Yokohama F. Marinos players
Nagoya Grampus players
People from Yaizu, Shizuoka
Association football defenders